"The Walk" is a song written by Jimmy McCracklin and Bob Garlic and performed by McCracklin.  It reached #5 on the U.S. R&B chart and #7 on the U.S. pop chart in 1958.

Other charting versions
The Inmates released a version which reached #36 on the UK Singles Chart and #107 on the U.S. pop chart in 1979.

Other versions
Bill Black's Combo released a version of the song on their 1962 album Movin'''.
The Hamsters released a version of the song on their 2002 album They Live by Night.
The T. Rex song "Beltane Walk" from the group's 1970 debut album T. Rex has riffs similar to "The Walk".
Freddie King's famous instrumental "Hide Away" quotes "The Walk" in one of its choruses.
The Steve Miller Band recorded a version of "The Walk" on their album Let Your Hair Down, which interestingly quotes the main lick from "Hide Away" on the intro.
The Beatles rehearsed the song during their Apple sessions in January 1969.  A partial recording of their version of the song was released on the Let It Be'' special edition in 2021.

References

1958 songs
1958 singles
1979 singles
Checker Records singles
Polydor Records singles